Hong Kong Central Hospital was a non-profit, general private hospital located in the Central area of Hong Kong Island, Hong Kong.

Services
The hospital's services include a large number of specialties which cover a broad area of medicine. At its height, the hospital carried out 60% of Hong Kong's abortions.

HKCH is a member of the Hong Kong Private Hospitals Association. It was surveyed bi-annually by the Trent Accreditation Scheme, a UK-based major international healthcare accreditation scheme, but is currently not accredited by any independent accreditation scheme.

Closure
The hospital closed on 1 September 2012, following a dispute that stretched back to 2009, and is the first private hospital in the city to close its doors. Plans for the site's reconstruction, which includes building a 25-storey non-profit hospital, were submitted in January 2017.

See also 
List of hospitals in Hong Kong

References

External links

Hospitals established in 1966
Hospitals disestablished in 2012
Defunct hospitals in Hong Kong